The 2008 FIFA U-17 Women's World Cup is the first women's football edition of the U-17 World Cup. It was held in New Zealand from 28 October to 16 November 2008. North Korea won the first edition, extending their grip of women's youth football having won the then-most recent U-20 Women's World Cup.

Host cities

Matches were played in four New Zealand cities:
 The Auckland conurbation, New Zealand's largest metropolitan area, hosted the final and 3rd place playoff. The designated host stadium is located in North Shore City.
 Hamilton hosted two of the quarter-finals.
 Wellington, New Zealand's capital city, hosted two of the quarter-finals.
 Christchurch, the only host city in the South Island, hosted the semi-finals.

Pool matches were spread evenly among these cities. The host nation, New Zealand, was based mostly in Auckland but played one pool match in Wellington.

Qualified teams

Squads

Tournament

Group stage
All times local (UTC+13)

Group A

Group B

Group C

Group D

Knockout stage
All times local (UTC+13)

Quarterfinals

Semifinals

3rd Place Playoff

Final

Winners

Awards

Goalscorers

Dzsenifer Marozsán of Germany won the Golden Shoe award for scoring six goals. In total, 113 goals were scored by 69 different players, with two of them credited as own goals.

6 goals

 Dzsenifer Marozsán

5 goals

 Vicki DiMartino

4 goals

 Chinatsu Kira
 Natsuki Kishikawa
 Jon Myong-hwa
 Courtney Verloo

3 goals

 Pauline Crammer
 Lynn Mester
 Rosie White
 Ho Un-byol
 Lee Hyun-young

2 goals

 Nkem Ezurike
 Tatiana Ariza
 Danielle Carter
 Marine Augis
 Alexandra Popp
 Turid Knaak
 Haruka Hamada
 Mana Iwabuchi
 Saori Takahashi
 Yun Hyon-hi
 Jacqueline Gonzalez
 Ji So-yun
 Kristie Mewis

1 goal

 Ketlen Wiggers
 Raquel Fernandez
 Rafaelle Souza
 Rachel Lamarre
 Ingrid Vidal
 Raquel Rodríguez
 Britta Olsen
 Linette Andreasen
 Simone Boye
 Isobel Christiansen
 Jessica Holbrook
 Lauren Bruton
 Lucy Staniforth
 Rebecca Jane
 Camille Catala
 Charlotte Poulain
 Lea Rubio
 Inka Wesely
 Leonie Maier
 Tabea Kemme
 Deborah Afriyie
 Florence Dadson
 Isha Fordjour
 Chiaki Shimada
 Kei Yoshioka
 Marika Ohshima
 Natsumi Kameoka
 Yuiko Inoue
 Annalie Longo
 Amarachi Okoronkwo
 Amenze Aighewi
 Ebere Orji
 Soo Adekwagh
 Jang Hyon-sun
 Kim Un-hyang
 Kim Un-ju
 Ri Un-ae
 Gloria Villamayor
 Paola Genes
 Rebeca Fernández
 Go Kyung-yeon
 Lee Min-sun
 Song Ah-ri

Own goal

 Hong Myong-hui (playing against the United States)
 Cris Mabel Flores (playing against the United States)

References
FIFA U-17 Women's World Cup New Zealand 2008 , FIFA.com
FIFA Technical Report

FIFA
FIFA
FIFA U-17 Women's World Cup tournaments
International women's association football competitions hosted by New Zealand
October 2008 sports events in New Zealand
November 2008 sports events in New Zealand
2008 in youth association football